Gonzalo Alejandro Jara Reyes (born 29 August 1985) is a Chilean professional footballer who currently plays for Chilean Primera División club Coquimbo Unido. He is a versatile defender and can play in either a full-back role or as a centre-back.

Formed at Huachipato, he later won three league titles at Colo-Colo. In 2009, he moved to England, where he represented West Bromwich Albion, Brighton & Hove Albion and Nottingham Forest, joining Mainz in 2014.

Jara has played for the Chile national team since 2006, earning over 100 caps. He played in two FIFA World Cups (2010 and 2014), and four Copa América, being part of the team that won the title in 2015 and in 2016, in the Copa América Centenario.

Club career
Born in Hualpén, Jara made his professional debut in 2003 for Huachipato, where he played until his 2007 transfer to Colo-Colo.

Colo-Colo agreed to transfer him to English Championship team West Bromwich Albion for a fee of $3 million in August 2009, but the buying club chose not to proceed with the deal. However, they later resurrected the deal and Jara signed for Albion for a fee of £1.4 million on a three-year contract on 25 August 2009. He scored his first goal for West Brom in a 2–1 away win against Leicester City on 7 November 2009. His second came against Arsenal on 25 September 2010, scoring in a 3–2 victory for West Brom at the Emirates Stadium.

On 21 October 2011, Jara joined Championship side Brighton & Hove Albion on a loan deal initially lasting until January 2012. However, on 20 December 2011, West Brom recalled him and two other players also on loan at other clubs due to an injury crisis. Jara returned to Brighton & Hove Albion on a loan deal lasting until the end of the season on 31 January 2012.

He joined another Championship side, Nottingham Forest, on loan until the end of the season on 10 January 2013. On 19 June, after his release from West Bromwich, he joined Forest on a permanent one-year deal. He was one of seven players released from the club on 27 May 2014.

On 16 July 2014, he was given a two-year contract with an option for a third year by 1. FSV Mainz 05. On 16 January 2016, he agreed to terminate his contract with them.

International career

Youth teams
In 2005, Jara represented Chile at the 2005 FIFA World Youth Championship in the Netherlands, scoring a goal in Chile's 7–0 victory over Honduras. Jara was Chile's captain in the prestigious 2008 Under-23 Toulon Tournament, where he has played in the 5–3 victory against France, as well as the 2–0 victories against the Netherlands and Japan. He missed the semi-final match versus Ivory Coast due to yellow cards.

Senior team

He was chosen by coach Nelson Acosta to play for Chile during their 2006 tour through Europe where they played the Republic of Ireland in Dublin, Ivory Coast in Toulon and Sweden in Stockholm.

He also played for Chile in the 2007 Copa América against Ecuador, Brazil, and Mexico. He scored his first international goal for Chile against Venezuela during the CONMEBOL 2010 World Cup qualifiers, and also played at the final tournament.

In 2013, during a 2014 FIFA World Cup qualifier he provoked Uruguayan Luis Suárez by holding and pinching him around the waist with one hand and grabbing his crotch with the other. Suárez subsequently punched Jara, but both parties went unpunished. At the final tournament, he was the fifth and final Chilean player used in a penalty shoot-out against Brazil in the Round of 16 in Belo Horizonte.  His shot missed, rebounding off the right-hand goal post, which eliminated his team from the competition.

In the 2015 Copa América quarter-finals match against Uruguay he provoked Uruguayan Edinson Cavani into a second yellow card and expulsion by slapping Cavani and, according to replays, appeared to insert his finger into Cavani's anus. Jara then faked a fall to the ground. The incident received almost immediate and prominent international coverage from newspapers and the internet, mostly condemning Jara.  Massive coverage included articles, columns, blogs, memes, and cartoons accusing Jara of inappropriately touching Cavani and then diving theatrically. Press in Australia likened the incident to the infamous on-field, anus-poking tactics of rugby league player John Hopoate in 2001. Although unpunished during the match, Jara was suspended for two games, the remainder of the tournament, which Chile eventually won. Mainz criticised Jara for the incident and stated that he would be sold.

Career statistics

International

International goals
Scores and results list Chile's goal tally first.

Other works
Still a player of Coquimbo Unido, in November 2022, Jara joined TNT Sports Chile as a football commentator for the program Todos somos técnicos (We are all coaches) in the context of the 2022 FIFA World Cup, alongside Gustavo Quinteros, Gissella Gallardo and Roberto Tobar.

Honours

Club
Colo-Colo
Primera División (3): 2007 Apertura, 2007 Clausura, 2008 Clausura

Universidad de Chile
Primera División (1): 2017 Clausura

International
Chile
Copa América: 2015, 2016

See also
 List of footballers with 100 or more caps

References

External links

1985 births
Living people
People from Concepción Province, Chile
Chilean footballers
Chilean expatriate footballers
Chile international footballers
Chile under-20 international footballers
Association football defenders
C.D. Huachipato footballers
Colo-Colo footballers
West Bromwich Albion F.C. players
Brighton & Hove Albion F.C. players
Nottingham Forest F.C. players
1. FSV Mainz 05 players
Universidad de Chile footballers
Estudiantes de La Plata footballers
Atlético Morelia players
Mazatlán F.C. footballers
Club Tijuana footballers
Unión La Calera footballers
Coquimbo Unido footballers
Chilean Primera División players
Premier League players
English Football League players
Bundesliga players
Argentine Primera División players
Liga MX players
2007 Copa América players
2010 FIFA World Cup players
2011 Copa América players
2014 FIFA World Cup players
2015 Copa América players
Copa América Centenario players
2017 FIFA Confederations Cup players
2019 Copa América players
Copa América-winning players
Expatriate footballers in England
Expatriate footballers in Germany
Expatriate footballers in Argentina
Expatriate footballers in Mexico
Chilean expatriate sportspeople in England
Chilean expatriate sportspeople in Germany
Chilean expatriate sportspeople in Argentina
Chilean expatriate sportspeople in Mexico
FIFA Century Club
Chilean association football commentators